David Mach  (born 18 March 1956) is a Scottish sculptor and installation artist.

Life and work
Mach was born in Methil, Fife.

His artistic style is based on flowing assemblages of mass-produced objects. Typically these include magazines, vicious teddy bears, newspapers, car tyres, match sticks and coat hangers. Many of his installations are temporary and constructed in public spaces.

One example of his early magazine pieces, Adding Fuel to the Fire, was an installation assembled from an old truck and several cars surrounded and subsumed by about 100 tons of magazines, individually arranged to create the impression that the vehicles were being caught in an explosion of flames and billowing smoke.

An early influential sculpture was Polaris, exhibited outside the Royal Festival Hall, South Bank Centre, London in 1983. This consisted of some 6,000 car tyres arranged as a life size replica of a Polaris submarine. Mach intended it as a protest against the nuclear arms race meant to stir controversy. A member of the public who took exception to the piece tried to burn it down; unfortunately, he got caught in the flames himself and suffered fatal burns.

In the early 1980s Mach started to produce some smaller-scale works assembled out of unstruck match sticks. These mostly took the form of human or animalistic heads and masks, with the coloured tips of the match heads arranged to construct the patterned surface of the face. After accidentally setting fire to one of these heads, Mach now often ignites his match pieces as a form of performance art.

Mach has also produced some larger-scale permanent public works such as Out of Order in Kingston upon Thames, the Brick Train (a depiction of an LNER Class A4 steam engine made from 185,000 bricks, which can be seen near Morrison's supermarket on the A66 just outside Darlington) and the Big Heids visible from the M8 between Glasgow and Edinburgh.

A second strand to Mach's work are his collage pieces. Partly as a result of having access to thousands of reproduced images in the magazines left over from many of his installations, Mach began to experiment with producing collages. So far, this has culminated in National Portrait, a 3 m by 70 m collage for the Millennium Dome that featured many images of British people at work and at play.

Mach studied at Duncan of Jordanstone College of Art and Design (now a school of University of Dundee), Dundee, Scotland from 1974, graduating in 1979, then at the Royal College of Art, London between 1979 and 1982. Following several shows and public installations, Mach was nominated for the Turner Prize in 1988. Mach was elected Member of the Royal Academy of Arts in 1998 and was appointed Professor of Sculpture in 2000.

References

External links

 
 Exhibition July to October 2011 at the City Art Centre in Edinburgh
 Works in the National Galleries of Scotland
 David Mach on Artcyclopedia
 Profile on Royal Academy of Arts Collections

1956 births
Living people
Scottish male sculptors
British installation artists
Alumni of the University of Dundee
Alumni of the Royal College of Art
Scottish contemporary artists
Royal Academicians
People from Methil
20th-century Scottish male artists
21st-century Scottish male artists
Collage artists